Swan Theatre may refer to:

 The Swan (theatre), an Elizabethan playhouse
 Swan Theatre, Stratford-upon-Avon, a theatre belonging to the Royal Shakespeare Company in Stratford-upon-Avon, England
 Swan Theatre, Worcester, a theatre in Worcester, England
 Wycombe Swan, a theatre in High Wycombe, Buckinghamshire, England